Jan Stráský (24 December 1940 – 6 November 2019) was a Czech politician. He served as the last prime minister of Czechoslovakia in 1992.

Early life 
Stráský studied philosophy and political economy at the Charles University in Prague. From 1958 to 1990 he worked at the Central bank of Czechoslovakia. From 1964 to 1969 he was a member of the Communist Party of Czechoslovakia.

In 1991 Stráský became a member of the Civic Democratic Party. From 1992 he was a member of parliament, minister of transportation (1993–1995), and minister of health (1995–1996). From 2 July to 31 December 1992 he served as prime minister. When Czechoslovak President Václav Havel resigned on 20 July 1992 due to his disagreement with the dissolution of Czechoslovakia, Stráský also took on some presidential duties until the country was formally dissolved at the end of 1992. 

From 2001 to 2006 Stráský was the regional head of government in the South Bohemian Region, at which point he left politics. From 2011 to 2012 he was the director of Šumava National Park.

See also 
 History of Czechoslovakia
 List of prime ministers of Czechoslovakia

References 

1940 births
2019 deaths
Politicians from Plzeň
Health ministers of the Czech Republic
Communist Party of Czechoslovakia politicians
Civic Democratic Party (Czech Republic) prime ministers
Freedom Union – Democratic Union politicians
Charles University alumni
Prime Ministers of Czechoslovakia
Transport ministers of the Czech Republic
Civic Democratic Party (Czech Republic) Government ministers